Gero II (c. 975 – 1 September 1015 at Krosno Odrzańskie) was the eldest son of Thietmar, Margrave of Meissen, and Schwanehilde (Suanhild), daughter of Herman, Duke of Saxony. He was therefore probably a grandson of Hidda and Christian of Thuringia and named for his great uncle Gero the Great. He succeeded his probable uncle, Hodo, as Margrave of the Saxon Ostmark including Mark Lausitz (Lusatia) in 993 upon the death of margrave of Lusatia Hodo or Odo I, Margrave of the Saxon Ostmark.

Gero was created Count of Hassegau in 992, just a year before becoming margrave. He died in his territory in battle with a Polish army of Boleslaw I in Gau Diadesi and was buried in his family's monastery of Nienburg. He was survived by his wife Adelaide (Athelheidhe) and one son, Thietmar, who succeeded him.

References
Medieval Lands Project: Nobility of Meissen.

970s births
1015 deaths
Margraves of the Saxon Ostmark